Ngo-Ketunjia is a department of Northwest Province in Cameroon. The capital of the department lies at Ndop. Within the self-declared  Federal Republic of Ambazonia, Ngo-Ketundjia County forms part of  Savannah State.

Subdivisions
The Division is divided administratively into 3 Subdivisions and in turn into villages.

Subdivisions 
Ngo-ketunjia, has 4 subdivisions; the headquarters lies at Ndop-Bamunka
 Ndop
 Balikumbat
 Babessi
 Bangourain

References

External links

Departments of Cameroon
Northwest Region (Cameroon)